is a masculine Japanese given name.

Possible writings
Kazuya can be written using different kanji characters and can mean:
一八, "one, eight"
一矢, "one, arrow"
一也, "one, to be"
一夜, "one, night"
和也, "harmony, to be"
和矢, "harmony, arrow"
和哉, "harmony, particle"
和夜, "harmony, night"
冬也, "winter, to be"
冬夜, "winter, night"
The name can also be written in hiragana or katakana.

People with the name
Kazuya Abe, Japanese mixed martial artist
, Japanese slalom canoeist
, Japanese sport wrestler
Kazuya Fujita (一也), Japanese professional baseball infielder
Kazuya Fukuura (和也), Japanese professional baseball first baseman
Kazuya Fukuzaki (冬也), Japanese footballer
Kazuya Hatayama (和也), Japanese politician
Kazuya Hiraide (和也), Japanese ski mountaineer and mountain climber
Kazuya Ichijō (和矢), Japanese voice actor
, Japanese footballer
, Japanese footballer
Kazuya Kamenashi (和也), Japanese singer–songwriter, actor and member of J-pop idol group KAT-TUN
Kazuya Kaneda (和也), Japanese swimmer
, Japanese mathematician
Kazuya Kawabata (和哉), Japanese football player
, Japanese writer who authored Mai, the Psychic Girl and Pineapple Army
Kazuya Kojima (一哉), Japanese comedian and actor
Kazuya Kuroda (和也), Japanese animator, character designer and illustrator
Kazuya Maekawa (和也), Japanese football player
Kazuya Maruyama (和也), Japanese politician, attorney, and tarento
Kazuya Minekura (かずや), Japanese manga artist
Kazuya Murata (和哉), Japanese football player
Kazuya Nakai (和哉 born 1967), Japanese voice actor
Kazuya Oshima (和也), Japanese racing driver
Kazuya Okazaki (和也), Japanese football player
Kazuya Okazaki (和也), Japanese former professional racing cyclist
, Japanese footballer
, Japanese futsal player
, Japanese film and television director
Kazuya Takahashi (和也), Japanese actor
Kazuya Takamiya (和也), Japanese professional baseball pitcher
, Japanese water polo player
Kazuya Tatekabe (和也 1934-2015), Japanese voice actor
Kazuya Tsurumaki (和哉), Japanese anime director
Kazuya Tsutsui (和也), Japanese professional baseball pitcher
Kazuya Sakamoto, Japanese member of the jpop band ON/OFF
Kazuya Yamamura (和也), Japanese football player
Kazuya Yoshioka (和也), Japanese ski jumper

Fictional characters
Kazuya Amon (亜門 一也), a secret character from the game Yakuza 2
Kazuya Aoi, main character of Freezing
Kazuya Aoshima (カズヤ), one of the main characters from Little Battlers Experience
Kazuya Hiramaru (一也), supporting character from Bakuman
Kazuya Kinoshita (和也), main character of Rent-A-Girlfriend
Kazuya Maeda (一也), main character of Photo Kano
Kazuya Minegishi (一哉), main character of Devil Survivor
Kazuya Mishima (一八), a main character in the Tekken fighting game series
Kazuya Miyuki (一也), one of the main characters from Diamond no Ace
Kazuya Nanase (和弥), a major character from Glass Rose
Kazuya Shibuya (一也), a protagonist in the anime series Ghost Hunt
Kazuya Shiranami (カズヤ), the protagonist of Galaxy Angel II: Zettai Ryouiki no Tobira
Kazuya Tayama (和哉), supporting character in Hyōka
Kazuya Uesugi (和也), central in the anime and manga series Touch

See also
7353 Kazuya, a main-belt asteroid

Japanese masculine given names